Becks is an English and German surname. It is a variant to the more popular name Beck. This family name has been found in England since the 14th century and the Netherlands and Germany since the 16th century. Later, in the 19th century, this family name was also found in Ohio, United States, as well as in the Australian states of New South Wales and Queensland.

The word originates from the Old Norse word "bekkr". This family name is related to the living place at a Brook. "Becks" is herewith related to ("a stream or brook") and cognate with German "Bach".

List of people with surname Becks 

 Elvira Becks (born 1976), Dutch gymnast
 Ida M. Bowman Becks (1880–1953), married name of American elocutionist and suffragist Ida M. Bowman

References 

Surnames
English-language surnames
German-language surnames